Mit Ghamr is an Egyptian center producing aluminium accounting for more than 70% of Egypt's total production, especially aluminum utensils. It is a city in Dakahlia Governorate, where it is second only to Al Mansurah in population and importance.

Geography
Mit Ghamr is located on Damietta branch of the Nile, and just on the opposite side of the Nile located another city called Zifta which belongs to Gharbia Governorate. Mit Ghamr is located in the middle of four governorates, Dakahlia to the north, Al Qaliobiah to the south, Al Sharqiah to the east and Al Gharbiah to the west. It is about 43 kilometers away from Al Mansurah and 28 kilometers away from Zagazig, the capital of Sharqia, also about 35 kilometers from Banha, the capital of Qalyubia, and 29 kilometers from Tanta, the capital of Al Gharbiah.

Villages
Mit Ghamr includes many villages such as Mit Yaeish, Mit El Faramawi, Mit Nagy, Dundait, Masara, Simbo Maqam, Makkam, Kafr Serenga, Sant Mai, and Sanafa. al boha Those villages are located around the city where farmers grow various crops such as corn, rice, wheat and cotton.

Education
In , one of the many villages surrounding Mit Ghamr, is a newly-founded branch of Al Azhar University. This university was built by locals and serves hundreds of students.

Religion
Mit Ghamr also has a large Coptic Orthodox Church, called Marigirgis church. The church has been there for many years. Some people thought that Saint George appeared in the church around the year 1920 when there was a big fire in the town and the church was the only place saved from the fire, claiming that they saw him hovering on top of the church with his horse.

Mit Ghamr was the town in which Dr. Ahmad El Naggar set up the first Islamic bank which pioneered the global Islamic Banking system.

Climate
Köppen-Geiger climate classification system classifies its climate as hot desert (BWh).

Notable people
Mit Ghamr is home to one of the best known Islamic scholars, Sheikh Muhammad Metwally Al Shaarawy, who was born in the village of Dakadous where he was finally buried, and Sheikh Abdulsalam Hassan Qandeel (عضو الإتحاد العالمى لعلماء المسلمين) who was born in the village of Simbo Maqam. Other people from Mit Ghamr are:
 Poet Alawadi Elwakil
 Lawyer Mortada Mansour

References

Populated places in Dakahlia Governorate